Sugar Wharf is a mixed-use development currently under construction at Queens Quay East, across the street from the Redpath Sugar Refinery, in Toronto, Ontario. It will contain five high-rise condo towers ranging in height from 64 to 90 storeys, a mid-rise rental residential building, and a multi level retail space that will contain a grocery store and an LCBO. All buildings will be connected to the PATH network.

The development is projected to house 8,000 residents.

The  parcel cost $260 million when purchased in May 2016. Originally, the central building on the site was the headquarters of the Liquor Control Board of Ontario, and a large attached warehouse.

References

Buildings and structures in Toronto
Condominiums in Canada